Tamás Géringer (born 19 May 1999) is a Hungarian professional footballer who plays for Kazincbarcikai SC on loan from Diósgyőri VTK.

Club statistics

Updated to games played as of 11 May 2019.

References

External links

1999 births
Living people
Footballers from Budapest
Hungarian footballers
Hungary youth international footballers
Association football defenders
Diósgyőri VTK players
Kazincbarcikai SC footballers
Nemzeti Bajnokság I players
Nemzeti Bajnokság II players